Jean Weill was a Swiss fencer. He competed in the men's foil event at the 1900 Summer Olympics.

References

External links
 

Year of birth missing
Year of death missing
Swiss male foil fencers
Olympic fencers of Switzerland
Fencers at the 1900 Summer Olympics
Place of birth missing
Place of death missing